The 2021 Le Samyn was the 53rd edition of the Le Samyn road cycling one day race in Belgium. It was a 1.1-rated event on the 2021 UCI Europe Tour and the first event in the 2021 Belgian Road Cycling Cup.

Teams
Seven UCI WorldTeams, nine UCI ProTeams, and nine UCI Continental teams made up the twenty-five teams that participated in the race.

UCI WorldTeams

 
 
 
 
 
 
 

UCI ProTeams

 
 
 
 
 
 
 
 
 

UCI Continental Teams

Result

References

Sources

External links 
 

Le Samyn
Le Samyn
Le Samyn